Toni Z. Kalem (born August 29, 1950) is an American actress, screenwriter and director. Kalem is best known for her portrayal of Angie Bonpensiero on the HBO series The Sopranos.

Kalem grew up in Springfield Township, Union County, New Jersey. She appeared in such films as Double Jeopardy, Private Benjamin, Sister Act, The Wanderers, Eyes of the Beholder, Silent Rage and The Boy Who Drank Too Much. Her television credits include guest appearances on Starsky and Hutch, MacGyver, Another World and Police Woman. During the sixth season of The Sopranos, Kalem was elevated from guest star to series regular for her character Angie Bonpensiero, the widow of Sal "Big Pussy" Bonpensiero who runs a body shop in partnership with Tony Soprano.

In 1999, Kalem wrote and directed the film A Slipping Down Life. In 2004, she wrote the fifty-sixth episode for The Sopranos, called "All Happy Families..."

Filmography

Awards and nominations
Sundance Film Festival
1999: Nominated, "Grand Jury Prize for Most Dramatic Film" – A Slipping-Down Life

References

External links
 

1950 births
American film actresses
American television actresses
Living people
Actresses from New Jersey
People from Springfield Township, Union County, New Jersey
21st-century American women